Cry Vengeance is a 1954 American film noir crime film directed by and starring Mark Stevens. The cast also includes Joan Vohs and Martha Hyer. It was produced by Lindsley Parsons and distributed by Allied Artists.

Plot
San Francisco ex-cop Vic Barron's family has died and he has been disfigured, framed and imprisoned when he crossed the wrong mobsters. After his release, he wants revenge on gangster Tino Morelli, whom he considers responsible.

Morelli is hiding out in Ketchikan, Alaska. After his arrival there, Vic finds Morelli and Morelli's charming little daughter. With the help of tavern owner Peggy Harding, Vic discovers that Morelli did not order the bombing and that the true murderer was a hitman named Roxey.

Roxey, who has followed Vic, murders Morelli, but is wounded by Vic in a shootout, then falls from atop a dam. After saying farewell to Peggy and to Morelli's orphaned daughter, Vic travels back to San Francisco, but with a hint that he might return.

Cast
 Mark Stevens as Vic Barron
 Martha Hyer as Peggy Harding
 Skip Homeier as Roxey
 Joan Vohs as Lily Arnold 
 Douglas Kennedy as Tino Morelli
 Cheryl Callaway as Marie Morelli
 Mort Mills as Johnny Blue-eyes
 Warren Douglas as Mike Walters
 Lewis Martin as Nick Buda
 Don Haggerty as Lt. Pat Ryan
 John Doucette as Red Miller
 Dorothy Kennedy as Emily Miller

References

External links
 
 
 
 

1954 films
1954 crime films
American crime films
American black-and-white films
1950s English-language films
Film noir
Allied Artists films
Films set in Alaska
Films scored by Paul Dunlap
Films with screenplays by Warren Douglas
1950s American films